Crotales, sometimes called antique cymbals, are percussion instruments consisting of small, tuned bronze or brass disks. They are commonly played by being struck with hard mallets. However, they may also be played by striking two disks together in the same manner as finger cymbals, or by bowing. Their sound is rather like a small tuned bell, only with a much brighter sound and a much longer resonance. Similar to tuned finger cymbals, crotales are thicker and larger; they also have slight grooves in them. The name comes from the Greek crotalon, for a castanet or rattle.

Modern crotales are arranged chromatically and have a range of up to two octaves. They are typically available in sets (commonly one octave) but may also be purchased individually. Crotales are treated as transposing instruments; music for crotales is written two octaves lower than the sounding pitch to minimize ledger lines.

Crotal bells are a type of small bell, mostly medieval. A different form of crotal is found in Prehistoric Ireland. The National Museum of Ireland and British Museum have several examples on display dating from the late Bronze Age which were found in the Dowris Hoard, alongside various brass wind instruments.  These are bronze cylinders in the rough shape of a bull's testicle, with a piece of baked clay or a pebble inside. It is presumed they functioned as a type of rattle.  The hoard had 48 of them in total, in two sizes. Only two other examples are known, both Irish.

Uses 
One of the earliest uses of crotales in the orchestral repertoire is Hector Berlioz's Roméo et Juliette (1839). Other classical pieces featuring crotales include Claude Debussy's Prélude à l'après-midi d'un faune, Maurice Ravel's orchestration of his Alborada del gracioso and Henri Dutilleux's Cello Concerto.

The contemporary American composer John Adams uses them in many of his more colorful orchestral pieces such as Short Ride in a Fast Machine. Composer Julia Wolfe uses crotales in her oratorio Fire in my mouth.

Crotales are also found in popular music, particularly in rock music. Neil Peart of Rush used them as part of his basic drum kit for several years, featuring them in the introduction to the instrumental "YYZ", and Alan White of Yes used them in the middle instrumental section of "Awaken" from Going for the One.

References

External links

Cymbals
Keyboard percussion instruments
Orchestral percussion instruments
Early musical instruments
Plaque percussion idiophones